Elections to state legislatures were held in 46 U.S. states in 2014 with a total of 6,049 seats up for election (82 percent of the total number of state legislative seats in the United States). Six territorial chambers were up in four territories and the District of Columbia.  

Republicans initially gained control of nine legislative chambers: both chambers of the Nevada Legislature (which they held simultaneously for the first time since 1931), the Minnesota House of Representatives, the New Hampshire House of Representatives, the New Mexico House of Representatives, the West Virginia House of Delegates, the Colorado Senate, the Maine Senate, and the New York Senate, which was previously under a Republican-led coalition. This increased the total number of Republican-controlled state houses from 58 to 67. The day after the election, Republicans, who achieved a 17–17 tie in the West Virginia Senate, gained control of that chamber as well thanks to the defection of State Senator Daniel Hall, thus increasing their total gains to ten, for a final total of 68 state houses won. This allowed Republicans win control of either chamber of the West Virginia legislature for the first time since 1933.

The election left the Republicans in control of the highest amount of state legislatures in the party's history since 1928, and it also left the Democratic Party in control of the smallest number of state legislatures since 1860.

Summary table

Regularly-scheduled elections were held in 87 of the 99 state legislative chambers in the United States; nationwide, regularly-scheduled elections were held for 6,064 of the 7,383 legislative seats. Most legislative chambers held elections for all seats, but some legislative chambers that use staggered elections held elections for only a portion of the total seats in the chamber. The chambers that were not up for election either hold regularly-scheduled elections in odd-numbered years, or have four-year terms and hold all regularly-scheduled elections in presidential election years.

Note that this table only covers regularly-scheduled elections; additional special elections took place concurrently with these regularly-scheduled elections.

Results

State by state

Upper houses

Lower houses

Results

Territorial chambers

Upper houses

Lower houses

Unicameral

Notes

References

State legislatures of the United States
2014 elections in the United States
2014 in American politics
2014 state legislature elections in the United States